Hong Kong League Cup 2001–02 is the 2nd staging of the Hong Kong League Cup.

Fixtures

First round

Group stage

Final

References
 www.rsssf.com Hongkong 2001/02
 HKFA Website 聯賽盃回顧(二) (in chinese)

Hong Kong League Cup
League Cup
Hong Kong League Cup